Luis Ortega (born 12 July 1980) is an Argentine screenwriter, film director and television director.

Biography
Ortega attended film school at the Universidad del Cine in Buenos Aires.

Career
He wrote the screenplay for his feature film Black Box when he was 19 years old. His cinema work has been well received by film critics.  Diana Sanchez said, "With only two feature films... Luis Ortega is already considered one of Argentina's more impressive and original directorial voices. His first feature, Black Box, stood apart from the social critiques that characterized the films of his Argentine contemporaries."

In 2015, he directed the successful television series Historia de un clan related the history of Clan Puccio.

In 2016, he directed the successful television series El marginal, that was released in October 2016 by Netflix and in January 2018 by Universal Channel.

In 2018, he directed the movie El ángel.

Filmography
Director and writer
 Black Box (2002)
 Monobloc (2005)
 Lulu (2014)
 El ángel (2018)

References

External links
 
 

1980 births
Argentine film directors
Argentine screenwriters
Male screenwriters
Argentine male writers
Living people
People from Buenos Aires